Thulasidas is an Indian film and serial director who works in the South Indian film industry, predominantly in Malayalam cinema.

Filmography

Television

Sree mahabhagavatham (Asianet)
Swamy Ayyappan saranam (Asianet)
Devi mahathmyam (Asianet)
Devayani (Surya TV)
Sabarimala sri dharmashasta (Asianet)
Amma (Asianet)
Pranayam (Asianet)
Parishudhan (Flowers TV)

See also
List of Malayalam films from 1986 to 1990
List of Malayalam films from 1991 to 1995
List of Malayalam films from 1996 to 2000

References

External links

Indian television directors
Malayalam film directors
Living people
20th-century Indian film directors
21st-century Indian film directors
Year of birth missing (living people)